The Island of Dr. Destroyer is an adventure published by Hero Games in 1981 for the superhero role-playing game Champions.

Plot summary
Supervillain Dr. Destroyer has created a secret stronghold on the island of Destruga, from which he plans to control the entire planet using his soon-to-be-launched Hypnoray satellite. In The Island of Dr. Destroyer, the players must raid the island fortress to stop Dr. Destroyer's nefarious plot. The adventure describes the defenses, guards, vehicles, troops, and supervillains on the island.

Publication history
The Island of Dr. Destroyer was the first adventure created for the Champions role-playing game. The adventure was written by Steve Peterson and George MacDonald, with artwork by Mark Williams, and was published by Hero Games in 1981 as a 16-page book. Day of the Destroyer is its sequel.

In his 2014 book Designers & Dragons, Shannon Appelcline noted that after the publication of Champions, "Hero Games wasted no time in expanding their game. They had two supplements — the NPC book Enemies (1981) and the adventure The Island of Dr. Destroyer (1981) — ready to go by the next local convention."

Reception
In the April–May 1982 edition of White Dwarf (Issue #30), Dave Morris admitted this adventure was "logically thought-out and clearly presented." But he questioned whether players would be interested in playing larger-than-life superheroes in a real world setting, since "much of the appeal of a game like D&D lies in having fairly believable characters adventuring in a fantasy world." However he concluded, "All the same, the occasional bout of world-saving might be really enjoyable" and gave The Island of Dr. Destroyer an above-average rating of 8 out of 10.

In the September–October 1984 edition of Different Worlds (Issue 36), Russell Grant Collins called this adventure "well laid out", but thought the opposing supervillains "are not detailed at all." He also noted that although there are options to make the adventure easier if the player characters seem over-matched, there were no options to make the adventure more difficult if the superheroes "appear to be able to mop the floor with the villains provided without working up a sweat." Collins concluded "Overall, I find it difficult to recommend this module [...] Unless you're really hurting for a villain's secret hideout, skip this one."

In the December 1984 edition of Imagine (Issue 21), Pete Tamlyn noted that the supervillains used in this adventure were simply villains from the previously published supplement Enemies, forcing the gamemaster to buy both products in order to play this adventure, something that Tamlyn called "quite naughty."

References

Champions (role-playing game) adventures
Role-playing game supplements introduced in 1981